The Newcastle Songster, by John Marshall is a volume of six chapbooks, giving the lyrics of local, now historical songs, but virtually no other information. It was published by John Marshall in stages between 1812 and 1826.

Details
 The Newcastle Songster, by John Marshall  (full title – "The Newcastle Songster; being a choice collection of Songs, Descriptive of the Language and Manners of the Common People of Newcastle upon Tyne And the neighbourhood" (the latter parts suffixed with "part II", " part III" etc.) is a volume of 6 Chapbook style books of Geordie folk songs, each consisting of 24 pages and a grand total of 72 song lyrics, published ca 1812, 1812, 1814, 1821, 1824 and 1826 respectively.
The books were published and printed by John Marshall, one of the most prominent chapbook printers in Newcastle during the early nineteenth century. The books are undated and it is difficult to give an accurate date, but the fact that John Marshall did not move into the Flesh Market premises until 1811, dates them not before that date. Several of the later books can be dated approximately from the events, or dates within the titles. The first volumes appeared around the same time as John Bell's Rhymes of Northern Bards, published in 1812,. The six volume set of books contain some of the region's traditional songs and generally seem to stick to the same formulae as many other Chapbooks in using the same, or similar, well known songs. There are however a few "different" unusual and rare songs which do not appear in many other similar publications. It is assumed that these books, due to the content, would have been very popular with local population.

The publication 
It is, as the title suggests, a collection of songs which would have been popular, or topical, at the date of publication (or some time before). There is nothing at all in the way of biographies of any of the writers and virtually no details or histories of the events.

The front cover of the book was as thus :-

THE<br/ >
NEWCASTLE<br/ >
SONGSTER<br/ >
Being a Choice Collection of<br/ >
SONGS, <br/ >
Descriptive of the Language and Manners of the<br/ >
Common People of<br/ >
NEWCASTLE UPON TYNE<br/ >
And the Neighbourhood<br/ >
– - – - – - – - – -<br/ >
No pompous strains, nor labour'd lines are here, <br/ >
But genuine wit and sportive mirth appear: <br/ >
Northumbria's genius in her simple rhymes, <br/ >
Shall live an emblem to succeeding times. <br/ >
– - – - – - – - – -<br/ >
Newcastle upon Tyne: <br/ >
Printed by J. Marshall, in the Old Flesh-Market. <br/ >
Where here also may be had, a large and curious Assortment<br/ >
of Songs, Ballads, Tales, Histories, &c. <br/ >

Notes
A-C1  –  according to Allan's Tyneside Songs and Readings of 1891, the writer is George Cameron
A-E1  –  according to Allan's Tyneside Songs and Readings of 1891, the writer is Robert Emery
A-G2  –  according to Allan's Tyneside Songs and Readings of 1891, the writer is Robert Gilchrist
A-L1  –  according to Allan's Tyneside Songs and Readings of 1891, the writer is John Leonard
A-M1  –  according to Allan's Tyneside Songs and Readings of 1891, the writer is William Mitford
A-M3  –  according to Allan's Tyneside Songs and Readings of 1891, the writer is T Moor
A-R1  –  according to Allan's Tyneside Songs and Readings of 1891, the writer is Henry Robson
A-S1  –  according to Allan's Tyneside Songs and Readings of 1891, the writer is John Selkirk
A-S2  –  according to Allan's Tyneside Songs and Readings of 1891, the writer is John Shield
A-S3  –  according to Allan's Tyneside Songs and Readings of 1891, the writer is James Stawpert
A-S4  –   according to Allan's Tyneside Songs and Readings of 1891, the writer is William Stephenson
A-S5  –   according to Allan's Tyneside Songs and Readings of 1891, the writer is William Stephenson
A-T1  –   according to Allan's Tyneside Songs and Readings of 1891, the writer is Thomas Thompson
F-G1  –  according to Fordyce's Tyne Songster of 1840, the writer is John Gibson
F-G2  –  according to Fordyce's Tyne Songster of 1840, the writer is Robert Gilchrist
F-H1  –  according to Fordyce's Tyne Songster of 1840, the writer is Phil Hodgson
F-M1  –  according to Fordyce's Tyne Songster of 1840, the writer is William Mitford
F-O1  –  according to Fordyce's Tyne Songster of 1840, the writer is William Oliver
F-P2  – according to Fordyce's Tyne Songster of 1840, the writer is Cecil Pitt
F-S2  –  according to Fordyce's Tyne Songster of 1840, the writer is John Shield
F-W2  –  according to Fordyce's Tyne Songster of 1840, the writer is Thomas Wilson
Fr-W1 – according to France's Songs of the Bards of the Tyne – 1850, the writer is William Watson
Tune-A -The tune is not given in the book – but it has been added as attributed in Thomas Allan's Tyneside Songs and Readings of 1891
Tune-B -The tune is not given in the book – but it has been added as attributed in John Bell's Rhymes of Northern Bards 1812
Tune-BS -The tune is not given in the book – but it has been added as attributed in Northumbrian Minstrelsy of 1882 by Bruce and Stokoe
Tune-F -The tune is not given in the book – but it has been added as attributed in Fordyce's Tyne Songster of 1840
Tune-FA -The tune is not given in the book – but it has been added according to FARNE Folk archive resources North East
Tune-Fr  -The tune is not given in the book – but it has been added as attributed in France's Songs of the Bards of the Tyne – 1850
Z-1 – France's Songs of the Bards of the Tyne – 1850, Fordyce's Tyne Songster of 1840 and Allan's Tyneside Songs and Readings of 1891 give the author as John Morrison, but in this book it is stated as James Morrison

See also
 Geordie dialect words

References

External links
 Farne archives – click on “Newcastle songster – Parts 1–6” and “Go”

English folk songs
Songs related to Newcastle upon Tyne
Northumbrian folklore
Chapbooks